The Al-Omari Mosque is an early Islamic-era mosque in  the Roman city of Bosra, Syria. It was founded by Caliph Umar, who led the Muslim conquest of Syria in 636 CE, and  it was completed in the early 8th century by Caliph Yazid II. The mosque was renovated in the 12th and 13th century CE by the Ayyubid dynasties.

Before it was destroyed, this mosque was one of the oldest standing mosques in the world. It served as a rest stop for travelers, Arab caravans on trade routes through Syria and pilgrims traveling to Mecca. The travelers used the central courtyard of the mosque as a marketplace as well as a place to sleep. The arcades of the mosque on the eastern and western sides enclosed this central courtyard. The south side of the mosque had a double arcade that led to the mosque's prayer hall.

The mosque's square minaret was one of the earliest examples of Umayyad-style minarets. Mosques in Damascus and Aleppo have similar style minarets from the same dynasty. This style of minaret was potentially inspired by the steeples of Syrian churches.

Damage to Bosra began in 2012, as shells and tanks caused significant damage during the Syrian civil war. In 2014, shell crater damage caused a hole in the roof of the mosque, and the upper level of the mosque was also destroyed. Rubble from the mosque is scattered around the destruction site, and there is shell damage in the surrounding area as well. In March 2015, rebels captured Bosra from the Syrian Government after heavy shelling of the town and caused further damage to the area.

See also
Bosra

References

8th-century mosques
Mosques in Syria
Umayyad architecture in Syria
Bosra
Buildings and structures in Daraa Governorate
8th-century establishments in the Umayyad Caliphate
Mosques completed in 721